Álvaro Fabián González Pintos (born 12 September 1973 in Canelones) is a former Uruguayan footballer who last played for Danubio F.C. in the Uruguayan Primera División.

Club career
González began his career playing for Uruguayan side Cerro who back then played at the Primera División Uruguaya. He then moved to Bella Vista of the same league. In 2002, after a spell at Bella Vista and Chilean side Everton, he joined Pumas at age 28. He played two seasons for Pumas and participated in the Copa Libertadores but did not become a regular member of the squad. Instead, he dropped down to play in the Primera A with Dorados de Sinaloa where he played 34 games scoring 10 goals. He was then transferred to another Primera A team, Lagartos de Tabasco where he played in 85 games scoring 46 goals. In 2006 moved to Puebla FC, who did not manage promotion after being relegated in 2005 to the Primera A. At Puebla, 'Bolita' quickly became a fan favorite as he helped the club win the 2006-07 championship. By doing so, he was top scorer of the Primera A two times where he scored 19 goals in the Apertura and then 22 goals in the Clausura. González was fundamental in Puebla's promotion to the Primera División in 2007. In 2009, he was released by Puebla FC and signed with Primera A's  club and city rival Lobos de la BUAP where he scored 9 goals in 19 matches, and returning to Puebla FC shortly afterwards. Despite scoring most goals at the Primera A, he currently persists as the fourth all time topscorer for Puebla FC with 72 goals, 11 goals behind one of Puebla's emblems of the 90s, the Chilean Carlos Poblete. On December 29, 2010, with 37 years old, Alvaro González signed a one-year contract with the Uruguayan club Danubio FC.

Clubes

Honors
Puebla FC
 Campeonato de Ascenso  2007
 Primera División A  Apertura 2006

Individual
Goal scoring Title
Puebla FC Apertura 2006(19) Clausura 2007(22)

References

External links

1973 births
Living people
People from Canelones Department
Uruguayan footballers
Uruguayan expatriate footballers
Everton de Viña del Mar footballers
C.A. Cerro players
C.A. Bella Vista players
Danubio F.C. players
Club Universidad Nacional footballers
Dorados de Sinaloa footballers
Lagartos de Tabasco footballers
Club Puebla players
Lobos BUAP footballers
Expatriate footballers in Chile
Expatriate footballers in Mexico
Chilean Primera División players
Liga MX players
Association football forwards